Actinernoidea is a superfamily of sea anemones in the order Actiniaria, Until 2014, this taxon was considered to be a separate suborder of the family Actiniaria.

The following families are recognized in the superfamily Actinernoidea:
 Actinernidae Stephenson, 1922
 Halcuriidae Carlgren, 1918

References

 
Anenthemonae
Obsolete animal taxa
Cnidarian suborders